The 1986 WUKO World Karate Championships are the 8th edition of the World Karate Championships, and were held in Sydney, Australia from November 21 to November 25, 1986.

Medalists

Men

Women

Medal table

References

External links
 World Karate Federation
 Results
 Report

World Championships
World Karate Championships
World Karate Championships
International sports competitions hosted by Australia
Karate Championships
1980s in Sydney
Karate competitions in Australia